In enzymology, a 3alpha,7alpha,12alpha-trihydroxycholestan-26-al 26-oxidoreductase is an enzyme that catalyzes the chemical reaction:

(25R)-3alpha,7alpha,12alpha-trihydroxy-5beta-cholestan-26-al + NAD+ + H2O  (25R)-3alpha,7alpha,12alpha-trihydroxy-5beta-cholestan-26-oate + NADH + 2 H+

The 3 substrates of this enzyme are (25R)-3alpha,7alpha,12alpha-trihydroxy-5beta-cholestan-26-al, NAD+, and H2O, whereas its 2 products are (25R)-3alpha,7alpha,12alpha-trihydroxy-5beta-cholestan-26-oate, NADH, and H+. This enzyme participates in bile acid biosynthesis.

Nomenclature 

This enzyme belongs to the family of oxidoreductases, specifically those acting on the aldehyde or oxo group of donor with NAD+ or NADP+ as acceptor.  The systematic name of this enzyme class is (25R)-3alpha,7alpha,12alpha-trihydroxy-5beta-cholestan-26-al:NAD+ 26-oxidoreductase. Other names in common use include:
 cholestanetriol-26-al 26-dehydrogenase,
 3alpha,7alpha,12alpha-trihydroxy-5beta-cholestan-26-al, dehydrogenase, 
 trihydroxydeoxycoprostanal dehydrogenase, 
 THAL-NAD oxidoreductase, 
 3alpha,7alpha,12alpha-trihydroxy-5beta-cholestan-26-al:NAD+, and 
 26-oxidoreductase.

References

EC 1.2.1
NADH-dependent enzymes
Enzymes of unknown structure